Donald Richard Bussmeyer (born August 16, 1936) is an American criminal and a member of the FBI's Ten Most Wanted list in 1967.

Life as a criminal
A career criminal and drug addict with convictions for auto theft, attempted burglary, assault with intent to kill and armed robbery when, on March 2, 1967, he and two accomplices James Alaway and Russell Jones robbed $75,000 from a Los Angeles bank and becoming a federal fugitive in the process.

Arrest
Within a week Alaway was arrested on March 9, and Jones the following day, and sentenced to 17 and 10 years imprisonment respectively for their role in the robbery. Bussmeyer however, was able to evade authorities and, indicted on federal bank robbery charges in April, he was officially added as the 251st fugitive to the FBI's "Ten Most Wanted" list on June 28, 1967.

Due to large media coverage and publicity, Bussmeyer was eventually traced to a safehouse in Upland, California within two months and, on August 24, captured Bussmeyer along with his wife Hallie and associate Gene Harrington. Although two pistols were found in the house, Bussmeyer offered no resistance and, noting a tattoo "Don Bussmeyer Loves Joyce" on his chest, confirmed his identity. Bussmeyer was released in 1994.

Hallie Bussmeyer, also a drug addict, was held in federal custody along with Harrington for harboring a federal fugitive, while Bussmeyer, held under a $200,000 bond, would eventually be tried and convicted of the Los Angeles bank robbery.

References

1937 births
American bank robbers
American people convicted of assault
American people convicted of robbery
American prisoners and detainees
Criminals from California
FBI Ten Most Wanted Fugitives
Fugitives
Living people